The COVID-19 vaccination campaign in Greece began on 27 December 2020. As of the 30th of June 2022, 7.919.254 people have received their first dose (75.4% of total population), and 7.629.060 people have been fully vaccinated (72.6% of total population). A total of 6.119.231 people have received an additional booster shot (58.2% of total population). 


Vaccines on order 
There are several COVID-19 vaccines at various stages of development around the world.

References 

2020 in Greece
December 2020 events in Europe
2021 in Greece
January 2021 events in Europe
February 2021 events in Europe
March 2021 events in Europe
COVID-19 pandemic in Greece
Greece